The Hebrew Tabernacle of Washington Heights is an historic domed Art Deco style building and Reform synagogue. It is located at 551 Fort Washington Avenue, on the corner of 185th Street, in the Washington Heights neighborhood of Manhattan in New York City.

History

Building
Designed by architects Cherry & Matz of Manhattan, the building was built during the years 1931 to 1932 at 551 Fort Washington Avenue, across from Bennett Park on West 185th Street. It is Art Deco, with a bold and chalky limestone facade, with stainless steel and brass.

Church
It was built as Fourth Church of Christ, Scientist, founded in 1896 as West Side Church of Christ, Scientist, to replace its Solon Spencer Beman designed Neoclassical building at West 178th Street and Fort Washington Avenue, which it had sold to provide land for the George Washington Bridge. Fourth Church is no longer in existence.

Synagogue
The Hebrew Tabernacle Congregation purchased the building in 1973, as the church faced a dwindling congregation and increasing costs, and the building became a synagogue. The Hebrew Tabernacle Congregation, founded in 1905 in Harlem by German-Jewish founders, had outgrown its 1920s building on West 161st Street between Broadway and Fort Washington Avenue, and its Jewish congregants there were becoming increasingly isolated.

As of 1982, many of the synagogue's members had come to New York in the 1930s as Jewish refugees from central Europe (in fact, so many German Jews were in the neighborhood, that it was jokingly referred to as "Frankfurt on the Hudson"), and the synagogue had 500 families as members. It is a Reform synagogue, and a member of the Union for Reform Judaism.

On August 31, 2011, the building was added to the National Register of Historic Places.

Notable members of the Hebrew Tabernacle of Washington Heights

 Mark Levine (born 1969), New York City Council member for the 7th district, Democratic nominee for Manhattan Borough President
 Ruth Westheimer (born Karola Ruth Siegel and known as "Dr. Ruth"; born 1928), German-American sex therapist, talk show host, author, professor, Holocaust survivor, and former Haganah sniper.

See also
 National Register of Historic Places listings in Manhattan above 110th Street
List of former Christian Science churches, societies and buildings

References

External links
 Hebrew Tabernacle Congregation website
Mendelssohn on the Hudson; Episode 4: Lillian (Opus 85, No. 6), podcast.

1932 establishments in New York (state)
Art Deco architecture in Manhattan
German-Jewish culture in New York City
National Historic Landmarks in Manhattan
Properties of religious function on the National Register of Historic Places in Manhattan
Reform synagogues in New York City
Synagogue buildings with domes
Synagogues completed in 1932
Synagogues in Manhattan
Synagogues on the National Register of Historic Places in New York City
Washington Heights, Manhattan
Former Christian Science churches, societies and buildings in New York (state)
Churches in Manhattan
Churches completed in 1932
Churches on the National Register of Historic Places in New York (state)